The Radziłów pogrom was a World War II massacre committed on 7 July 1941 in the town of Radziłów, in German-occupied Poland. Local Poles, under SS orders or with German encouragement, forced most of the Jews of the town into a barn and set it on fire, Jews were also murdered in surrounding villages. Death toll estimates vary from between 600 and 2,000; only some 30 Jews survived the massacre due to help from local Poles.

The pogrom in Radziłów was similar to events in Grajewo, Wizna, Goniądz, Szczuczyn pogrom, Kolno, Wąsosz pogrom, Stawiski, Rajgród, and the Jedwabne pogrom.

Background

Pre-WWII 
In the 1928 Polish elections almost every Jewish resident of the town voted for a Jewish party, while 42% of the Polish electorate supported National Democracy.

On 23 March 1933, following the arrest of nine National Democracy members, supporters in its radical faction, the Camp for Greater Poland, initiated a pogrom which they referred to as a "revolution". Jewish property was looted, Jews were beaten, windows and market stalls demolished, and one Jewish woman was killed. The Polish police killed four of the Poles who were carrying out the violence against Jews and their property. As a consequence of the pogrom, the Camp for Greater Poland was outlawed by Poland's Interior Ministry.

The 1937 population of Radziłów was 2,500 including 650 Jews.

WWII 
The Germans entered the town on 7 September 1939, but turned the town over to the Soviet Union at the end of September in accordance with the Molotov–Ribbentrop Pact. On 23 June 1941 the Germans re-occupied the town as part of Operation Barbarossa. The Germans were greeted with a ceremonial gate, erected by Poles who had been formerly imprisoned by the Soviets, bearing a photograph of Hitler and praising the German army.

In the Soviet occupied zone, the Łomża and the western Białystok regions were among the few regions with a strong ethnic Polish majority. Following the brutal Soviet occupation, the Wehrmacht was greeted by local Poles as liberators. Jews were viewed en masse as Soviet collaborators, an attitude influenced by the widespread antisemitism in the area. In particular, the strong pre-war influence of the National Democracy party had formed the Żydokomuna ("Jewish communism") stereotype among locals. These conditions were the ground for favorable reception of German encouragements to carry out atrocities.

On 27 June 1941 the Germans named Józef Mordasiewicz and Leon Kosmaczewski as heads of the local collaborationist administration, and setup an auxiliary Polish police force headed by Konstanty Kiluk. At least ten of the auxiliary Police had previously been imprisoned by the NKVD and were released by the Germans. The Germans armed those Poles whom they saw as trustworthy with guns.

Over the next few weeks the Jews of Radziłów, as well as refugees from other villages who had taken up residence in town, were tormented by the German troops and some Poles. Jews were beaten and robbed, Jewish holy texts were desecrated, Jewish women were raped, and hundreds of Jews were murdered.

Szymon Datner wrote on Jewish appeals prior to the massacre:

Pogrom 
On 5 July 1941, the Germans returned to Radziłów, and on the next day a Gestapo man along with the local town secretary started rounding up Jews from their homes and directing them to the town square. The Jews were led to the square by Poles. Although German vehicles with machine guns arrived that day, they left on the 7th.

Following the German departure, local Poles armed with guns directed the Jews into a barn owned by Sitkowski. The doors were nailed shut, the building was doused with gasoline and set on fire. While the barn burned, the locals continued to hunt for Jews. Some Jews who managed to escape were shot, and some who were caught outside were forced to climb on the straw roof and jump into the burning barn. Jews from neighboring villages were not taken to the barn, but rather murdered on the spot. After the barn finished burning, Poles entered the barn and pulled gold
fillings from the mouths of corpses.

Most of the killings took place between 7 July and 9 July 1941. On the third day of the barn fire, the 9th, the Germans returned to Radziłów. By the second half of July, no Jews were left in Radziłów save a few that hid before the pogrom began. Death toll estimates vary from 600 to 2,000, some 30 Jews survived with help from local Poles.

Aftermath 
Following the massacre, the homes of the Jewish victims were plundered. According to Krzysztof Persak, the news of the Radziłów pogrom surely impacted the attitudes of the local Poles in Jedwabne who carried out the Jedwabne pogrom on 10 July 1941. Persak also is of the opinion that the nearly identical method of murder between Jedwabne and Radziłów indicates the influence of the German the Security Service and Security Police which were operating in the area, being an implementation of a directive of the Reich Security Main Office which aimed to inspire "folk pogroms".

The remaining Jews were interned in a small ghetto from August 1941. On 1 June 1942 most of the ghetto inmates were deported to labor on the Milbo estate. On 2 November the Jews deported to Milbo were deported to a transit camp in the village of Bogusze. From there they were sent to Treblinka extermination camp and murdered on arrival. Approximately nine Jews survived the war hiding in villages around Radziłów. On 28 January 1945 (five days after Soviet forces liberated the town), local Poles murdered two Jews who had survived in hiding.

Hermann Schaper, whose SS unit was involved in some of the atrocities in Radziłów, was tried in Germany in 1976 for other crimes against Poles and Jews and was sentenced to six years in prison, however following an appeal this was overturned and his health was declared too fragile for a new trial.

Eight local Polish perpetrators were tried in Polish courts after the war. Those convicted after the war were almost all inhabitants of small villages or members of the local auxiliary police. These were distinguished in local collective social memory as active participants as opposed to the mass of "ordinary" neighbors who merely stood by during the pogrom. However, transcripts from inquiries and trials show that these two groups were not separated by a barrier but that rather the police merely formed the front line.

References

External links
 Archived newspaper articles at radzilow.com

1941 in Poland
Mass murder in 1941
Poland in World War II
Holocaust massacres and pogroms in Poland
World War II crimes in Poland
July 1941 events